Goierri ("Highland(s)" in Basque) or "Basque Highlands" is one of the eight comarcas (Eskualdea in the Basque language) in the Spanish province of Gipuzkoa. It is composed of 18 municipalities, Beasain, Ordizia and Lazkao being the main towns. The main administrative center is Beasain.

Municipalities

The Basque language 
The region is traditionally Basque-speaking, having a higher proportion of Basque speakers than other comarcas in Gipuzkoa. According to data from 1996, around half the population of Goierri speak Basque as a mother tongue. The predominant dialect is the central dialect that proliferates much of Gipuzkoa's Basque speaking communities. Villages are more likely to be predominantly Basque-speaking with particularly strong Basque-speaking populations in the towns of Ordizia, Ataun, Lazkao and Beasain. Basque is the dominant language in education in the area, for example, Lazkao's San Benito Ikastola and Ataun San Martin's Joxemigel Barandiaran Eskola teaching exclusively through the Basque language with the exception of Spanish lessons.

External links

 Official Website .

References

Comarcas of Gipuzkoa